Phyllonorycter platani is a moth of the family Gracillariidae. The moth is found in Europe, the Near East and the eastern Palearctic realm, as well as California in the United States.

The wingspan is 8–10 mm. It flies in two generations from mid-June to November. .

The larvae feed on Platanus.

Notes
The flight season refers to Belgium and The Netherlands. This may vary in other parts of the range.

External links
 waarneming.nl  
 Lepidoptera of Belgium
 Phyllonorycter platani at UKmoths

platani
Moths of Europe
Moths of Asia
Moths of North America
Moths described in 1870